is a single-member electoral district for the House of Representatives, the lower house of the National Diet of Japan. It is located in the prefecture of Hokkaidō and consists of  Hokkaido's Hiyama and Oshima subprefectures.

History
From 1947 the district was known as the Hokkaido 3rd district and elected three members to the House. Under the 1994 reforms that came into effect at the 1996 general election, the district's boundaries were not changed but it was renamed to the 8th district and had its representation reduced to one. This reduction was offset by the introduction of the multi-member Hokkaido proportional representation block that elects eight members to represent the entire prefecture.

List of representatives

Recent results

Notes

References 

Politics of Hokkaido
Districts of the House of Representatives (Japan)